Tiszafüred is a town in Jász-Nagykun-Szolnok county, in the Northern Great Plain region of central Hungary.

Geography
Tiszafüred is the biggest city of the Lake Tisza region, and it is the capital city of the Lake Tisza. It is a favourite tourist spot and offers many recreational activities such as water skiing, bush walking, and thermal baths.

Politics 
The current mayor of Tiszafüred is Imre Újvári (Fidesz-KDNP).

The local Municipal Assembly, elected at the 2019 local government elections, is made up of 12 members (1 Mayor, 8 Individual constituencies MEPs and 3 Compensation List MEPs) divided into this political parties and alliances:

Notable residents
 Krisztián Budovinszky (1976-), footballer
 Anikó Szebenszky (1965-), race walker

Twin towns – sister cities

Tiszafüred is twinned with:
 Chotěboř, Czech Republic
 Płońsk, Poland
 Senta, Serbia

References

External links

  in Hungarian
Tiszafüred - KehilaLinks

Populated places in Jász-Nagykun-Szolnok County